Halopredone is a synthetic glucocorticoid corticosteroid which was never marketed.

References

Bromoarenes
Diketones
Organofluorides
Glucocorticoids
Pregnanes
Triols